Heilbronner Falken ('Heilbronn Falcons') are a professional ice hockey team based in Heilbronn, Germany. They currently play in DEL2, the second level of ice hockey in Germany. Prior to the 2013–14 season they played in the 2nd Bundesliga.

History
The club was founded as Heilbronner EC in 1986. They were renamed Heilbronner Falken two years later, in 1988. In 2007, the club was promoted to the 2nd Bundesliga by virtue of winning the Oberliga.

Current team

Achievements
Oberliga champion: 2007

Reference

External links
 heilbronner-falken.de – Heilbronner Falken official website

Ice hockey teams in Germany
Ice hockey teams in Baden-Württemberg
Heilbronn
Ice hockey clubs established in 1986
1986 establishments in West Germany